Frederico Chaves Guedes (born 3 October 1983), also known as Fred, is a Brazilian former professional footballer who played as a striker.

Fred began his career at América Mineiro before transferring to local rivals Cruzeiro in 2004. After two seasons there, he moved to Lyon of France in a protracted transfer saga, and won three consecutive Ligue 1 titles. He made his international debut for Brazil in 2005 and was selected for the 2006 World Cup, and was also part of their victories at the 2007 Copa América and the 2013 Confederations Cup. From 2009 to 2016, Fred played for Fluminense, where he won two Campeonato Brasileiro Série A titles in two years (2010 and 2012) and the Campeonato Carioca (2012 – scoring in final). In June 2016, Fred signed for Atlético Mineiro. After returning to Cruzeiro in 2018 and Fluminense in 2020, Fred retired from the professional game in July 2022.

Fred is the second-highest goalscorer in the history of Fluminense, with 199 goals across all competitions, as well as the all-time second-highest goalscorer of the Campeonato Brasileiro Série A, with 158. He also scored one of the fastest goals in professional football history while playing for América Mineiro, against Vila Nova during a Copa São Paulo de Juniores match. The goal was scored 3.17 seconds after the match started.

Club career

Brazil and transfer saga
Fred spent one season as a professional at América Mineiro of Belo Horizonte before he left for their city rival Cruzeiro in middle of the 2004 season. As Feyenoord had an agreement with América, the Dutch club received Magrão from Cruzeiro, and retained 10% economic rights on Fred, and Fred himself held 15%.

After scoring 41 goals in 43 games for Cruzeiro in the 2005 season, Fred was signed by defending Ligue 1 champions Lyon for €15 million. (of which €3 million was received by Fred, 5% as a solidarity contribution, €1.4 million to Lyon's agent and €510,913 in Brazilian taxes). Feyenoord then claimed Cruzeiro's 10% of the transfer fee, as the club alleged the fee was €1.5 million instead of the €933,908.70 in Cruzeiro's viewpoint. The Dutch club sued to the Court of Arbitration for Sport and won.

Lyon
With 14 goals in his first season, Fred was the second-highest goalscorer in the 2005–06 Ligue 1 season, and won his first league title with Lyon.

Although he missed two months of the 2006–07 season, Fred still scored 11 goals in 20 games, and was the club's top scorer as Lyon defended their title. In September 2006 he scored goal against Real Madrid in the group stage of the UEFA Champions League after a long pass by Juninho, where he outstrengthed defender Fabio Cannavaro before chipping the ball over goalkeeper Iker Casillas and into the goal.

During the 2007–08 season, however, Fred was injured during a training session at the 2007 Copa América. He made his comeback in October 2007, but due to competition with new signing Milan Baroš and youth product Karim Benzema, Fred had limited first team opportunities. 

In summer 2008 Fred was linked with a move to Bundesliga club Werder Bremen but it did not materialise. He played 15 games out of possible 20 for Lyon in the 2008–09 season. He played his last match for Lyon on 10 January 2009 after he requested to leave the club in December 2008. On 26 February 2009, he was released from his contract.

Fluminense
After being released from Lyon and refusing to return from Brazil, Fred signed a pre-contract with Brazilian club Fluminense, consequently agreeing to a five-year deal. He scored twice on his debut on 15 March 2009, as Fluminense beat Macaé 3–1. Fred helped Fluminense escape from relegation in 2009, and subsequently was the leader of the team that won the 2010 Campeonato Brasileiro Série A. Later in July 2011, he went on to break the record for most goals in the Brasileiro when he scored a brace against Bahia, taking his tally to 44 goals. The record was previously held by Magno Alves. On 11 November 2012, Fred scored two goals in a 3–2 win over Palmeiras, clinching the 2012 Campeonato Brasileiro Série A for Fluminense. Fred almost left the club after disagreements with head coach Levir Culpi in April 2016, but eventually remained.

Atlético Mineiro
On 8 June 2016, Atlético Mineiro club president Daniel Nepomuceno announced on his Twitter account that the club had signed Fred. The player agreed to a two-year deal with the club, according to its press representatives. Fred made his Atlético debut on 12 June 2016 in the Clássico Mineiro against rivals Cruzeiro. He scored and celebrated against his former club in a 2–3 defeat at the Estádio Independência. Fred was the top goalscorer of the 2016 Campeonato Brasileiro Série A, along with two other players, with 14 goals. He achieved the feat for the third time in his career, which is a record (also shared, with Romário, Túlio Maravilha and Dadá Maravilha).

Return to Cruzeiro
On 23 December 2017, Fred and Atlético agreed on the termination of his contract and on the same day it was announced his return to Cruzeiro, 12 years after originally leaving. He made his second debut for the club on 17 January 2018, in the season opening match against Tupi at the Mineirão in the Campeonato Mineiro, which ended in a 2–0 win for Cruzeiro.

Return to Fluminense
On 31 May 2020, Fred rejoined Fluminense on a two-year deal. In April 2022, he announced his decision to retire after struggling with diplopia and other physical issues. He played his final match for Fluminense on 9 July 2022, a Série A 2–1 win over Ceará at the Maracanã.

International career

Fred made his debut for Brazil as a late substitute in a friendly match against Guatemala on 27 April 2005. He scored his first two international goals on 12 November 2005 in an 8–0 friendly win against the United Arab Emirates.

Although he did not play during the qualifying campaign, Fred was named in Brazil's 2006 FIFA World Cup squad as a cover for strikers Ronaldo, Adriano and Robinho. After entering as a substitute, he scored in a 2–0 victory against Australia on 18 June when he tapped-in a shot from Robinho which had rebounded off the inside of goalkeeper Mark Schwarzer's near post in the 90th minute. The result put Brazil into the last 16 with a game to spare.

In the 2011 Copa América, Fred scored an 89th-minute equaliser against Paraguay in a 2–2 draw. In the quarter-finals, he was one of four Brazil players to miss in a 2–0 penalty shootout loss against the same opposition.

In 2013, Fred was established as Brazil's first-choice centre-forward by returning manager Luiz Felipe Scolari. On 6 February, Fred scored in a 2–1 defeat to England at Wembley Stadium, and went on to score in the return fixture, becoming the first player to score at the renovated Maracanã Stadium.

At the 2013 FIFA Confederations Cup, Fred was the joint top scorer of the tournament with five goals, and was awarded the Silver Shoe. On 22 June, he scored twice against Italy in a 4–2 group stage win. He later scored in a 2–1 semi-final victory over Uruguay, and capped his successful Confederations Cup campaign with two goals against Spain in the competition's final to help Brazil to a 3–0 victory.

In May 2014, Fred was named in Brazil's squad for the 2014 World Cup. In the opening match of the tournament, on 12 June against Croatia in São Paulo, Fred was fouled in the 69th minute, resulting in a controversial penalty which Neymar converted to make the score 2–1 ahead of an eventual 3–1 win. After receiving criticism for his performances in the opening two matches, Fred scored his only goal of the tournament in the final group match, a 4–1 victory over Cameroon which qualified the team for the round of 16. He managed just five shots on target at the tournament in six matches played. Fred's prolonged run of poor form saw the player receive hostile jeers from the home crowd whenever he touched the ball in the 7–1 defeat to Germany in Belo Horizonte. According to Opta Sports, Fred failed to make a single tackle, cross, run or interception during the match, and spent the most time in possession of the ball on the centre spot due to seven restarts and one kick-off. Following Brazil's 3–0 defeat to the Netherlands in the match for third place, Fred announced his retirement from international competition.

On 16 September 2014, it was reported that Fred came out of retirement after previously announcing retirement following the criticism he received during the 2014 World Cup. Despite his intention to return to the Seleção, Fred confirmed his international career is over the following year, as he has yet to feature in a Brazil squad since Luiz Felipe Scolari's departure.

Personal life
Fred is a convert to Protestant Christianity.

Career statistics

Club

International

*The match against Al Kuwait XI was not counted.

Scores and results list Brazil's goal tally first, score column indicates score after each Fred goal.

Honours
Lyon
 Ligue 1: 2005–06, 2006–07, 2007–08
 Coupe de France: 2007–08

Fluminense
 Campeonato Brasileiro Série A: 2010, 2012
 Campeonato Carioca: 2012, 2022
 Primeira Liga: 2016

Atlético Mineiro
 Campeonato Mineiro: 2017

Cruzeiro
 Copa do Brasil: 2018
 Campeonato Mineiro: 2018, 2019

Brazil
 Copa América: 2007
 FIFA Confederations Cup: 2013

Individual
 Bola de Prata: 2011, 2012
 Campeonato Brasileiro Série A Team of the Year: 2011, 2012
 Campeonato Brasileiro Série A Best Player: 2012
 Campeonato Brasileiro Série A Top Goalscorer: 2012, 2014, 2016
 FIFA Confederations Cup Silver Boot: 2013
 FIFA Confederations Cup Castrol Index Top XI: 2013

References

External links

1983 births
Living people
Sportspeople from Minas Gerais
Converts to Protestantism
Brazilian evangelicals
Association football forwards
Brazilian footballers
Clube Atlético Mineiro players
Cruzeiro Esporte Clube players
Olympique Lyonnais players
Fluminense FC players
Campeonato Brasileiro Série A players
Ligue 1 players
Brazil international footballers
2006 FIFA World Cup players
2007 Copa América players
2011 Copa América players
2013 FIFA Confederations Cup players
2014 FIFA World Cup players
FIFA Confederations Cup-winning players
Copa América-winning players
Brazilian expatriate footballers
Brazilian expatriate sportspeople in France
Expatriate footballers in France